Champollion is a lunar impact crater that lies on the far side of the Moon. It is located north-northeast of the larger crater Shayn, and south-southeast of Chandler.

This crater formation has been heavily damaged by subsequent impacts, and is now a battered depression in the surface. An unnamed crater overlays the eastern rim, and the remaining inner wall is incised along much of its circumference by lesser impacts. One of these forms a trough in the northern inner wall, with side walls that extend almost to the center of the floor.

Satellite craters
By convention these features are identified on lunar maps by placing the letter on the side of the crater midpoint that is closest to Champollion.

References

 
 
 
 
 
 
 
 
 
 
 
 

Impact craters on the Moon